Mount Galunggung (Indonesian: Gunung Galunggung, formerly spelled Galoen-gong) is an active stratovolcano in West Java, Indonesia, around  southeast of the West Java provincial capital, Bandung (or around  to the east of the West Java town of Tasikmalaya). Mount Galunggung is part of the Sunda Arc extending through Sumatra, Java and the Lesser Sunda Islands, which has resulted from the subduction of the Australian plate beneath the Eurasian plate.

For the first time since 1982 after eruptions finished and conditions seemed normal, on February 12, 2012, the status was upgraded to Alert based on changes in conditions.

On 28 May 2012, it was lowered from 2 back to 1 (On a scale of 1–4).

1822 eruption
Galunggung had its first historical eruption in 1822 that produced pyroclastic flows and lahars that killed 4,011 people.

Hazardous eruption of 1982

The last major eruption on Galunggung was in 1982, which had a Volcanic Explosivity Index of 4 and indirectly killed 18 people in traffic accidents and by starvation. This eruption also brought the dangers of volcanic ash to aviation to worldwide attention, after two Boeing 747 passenger jets flying downwind of the eruption suffered temporary engine failures and damage to exterior surfaces, both planes being forced to make emergency landings at Jakarta airport.

One plane, a British Airways aircraft traveling from Kuala Lumpur, Malaysia to Perth, Australia carrying 240 passengers, accidentally entered the ash cloud during night in June 1982  downwind of the volcano. All four engines failed due to the buildup of volcanic ash, and the aircraft descended for 16 minutes, losing  of its  altitude, until the crew managed to restart the engines and land in Jakarta.

The following month, a Singapore Airlines aeroplane with approximately 230 passengers aboard also inadvertently entered the cloud at night, and three of its four engines stopped. The crew succeeded in restarting one of the engines after descending . Both aircraft suffered serious damage to their engines and exterior surfaces.

Historical avalanche deposits

A hummocky deposit known as the Ten Thousand Hills of Tasikmalaya attracted the attention of early-20th-century geologists.  Houses were built on the hummocks since they provided good defence against hostile people, and being above the paddy fields were free of mosquitoes and rats.

Originally, it was thought that either it had been formed by a lahar caused by the release of the waters of the crater lake, or that it was man-made, composed of rocks and boulders dumped there after being cleared from paddy fields.

However, in the light of the Mount St. Helens eruption of 1980 and from examination of the Mount Shasta deposits, it has become clear that the hummocks are a debris-avalanche deposit. Like these mountains, Galunggung has a horseshoe-shaped crater indicating a massive landslide, and examination of shattered lava blocks revealed them to be similar to deposits on the other two volcanoes. According to radiocarbon dating of samples taken from a lava flow, the landslide happened within the last 23,000 years.

See also 
 Volcanoes of Java
 List of volcanoes in Indonesia
 List of volcanic eruptions by death toll

References

External links 
 
 
 NOAA facts and figures about Galunggung
 Volcanological Survey of Indonesia
 Official website of Indonesian volcanoes at USGS

Stratovolcanoes of Indonesia
Subduction volcanoes
Volcanoes of West Java
VEI-5 volcanoes
Active volcanoes of Indonesia
20th-century volcanic events
19th-century volcanic events
Holocene stratovolcanoes